Oasis Mountain is a summit in the U.S. state of Nevada.

Oasis Mountain was so named for its greenish color, when viewed from afar.

References

Mountains of Nye County, Nevada